Teoronto Block Historic District is a national historic district located in the Frankfort neighborhood of Rochester in Monroe County, New York. The district consists of 10 contributing buildings originally built beginning in 1844, with later additions and modifications.  It is reflective of Rochester's early commercial and industrial development as an Erie Canal-oriented boom town.  It includes a block long group of three story, brick commercial buildings, known as the Teoronto-Smith Block. They consist of nine five bay buildings with a continuous gable roof.  Also in the district is a set of attached commercial / industrial buildings.

It was listed on the National Register of Historic Places in 2010.

References

Commercial buildings on the National Register of Historic Places in New York (state)
Industrial buildings and structures on the National Register of Historic Places in New York (state)
Historic districts in Rochester, New York
Historic districts on the National Register of Historic Places in New York (state)
National Register of Historic Places in Rochester, New York
Erie Canal
Commercial buildings in Rochester, New York
Industrial buildings and structures in Rochester, New York